David Devdariani (born 28 October 1987) is a Georgian footballer who currently is unemployed. He played for the Georgian national team.

He began his career as a professional football player in 2004 at FC Tbilisi in Georgia and later signed a contract with Danish Superliga side AGF Aarhus in August 2008.

External links
AGF profile
Official Superliga stats

1987 births
Living people
Footballers from Georgia (country)
Georgia (country) under-21 international footballers
Georgia (country) international footballers
Aarhus Gymnastikforening players
Danish Superliga players
Expatriate footballers from Georgia (country)
Expatriate men's footballers in Denmark
Expatriate footballers in France
Association football midfielders